War Brigade is the ninth studio album of the German power metal band Mystic Prophecy. It was released by Massacre Records on the 18th of March 2016 and contains 12 tracks. The album was a selling success and contains some of the best known songs of the band like 'Metal Brigade', 'The Crucifix', 'Burning Out' and 'War Panzer'.

Track listing 
 Follow the Blind
 Metal Brigade
 Burning Out
 The Crucifix
 Pray to Hell
 10.000 Miles Away
 Good Day to Die
 The Devil is Back
 War Panzer
 Fight for One Nation
 War of Lies
 Sex Bomb

Credits 
 Roberto Dimitri Liapakis - vocals
 Markus Pohl - guitars 
 Connie "Connor" Andreszka - bass
 Tristan Maiwurm - drums  
 Laki Ragazas - guitars
 Produced by R.D. Liapakis
 Mixed by Fredrik Nordström
 Mastered by Christian Schmid & R.D. Liapakis
 Recorded at Prophecy & Music Factory Studios (Germany)
 Sound Engineer Christian Schmid
 Cover Art & General Artwork by Uwe Jarling
 Artwork & Layout Design by Anestis Goudas
 Band Photos by Peter Roth.

References

Source: Official Mystic Prophecy-homepage

2016 albums
Mystic Prophecy albums
Massacre Records albums